Tvishi is an appellation for wines produced in a  zone around Tvishi village in northwestern Georgia. The zone is on the right bank of the Rioni River and includes Alpana village.

Tvishi is a dry to semi-sweet, still white wine made from Tsolikouri grapes.

See also 
Georgian wine
Sweetness of wine
List of Georgian wine appellations

References 

Georgian wine
Georgian products with protected designation of origin